Strathroy District Collegiate Institute (SDCI) is one of two secondary schools in Strathroy, Ontario. It is a public high school in the Thames Valley District School Board. The school services feeder schools in the Strathroy area, as well as the outer regions such as Mt. Brydges, Parkhill, Kerwood, Coldstream, Poplar Hill, Glencoe and Delaware. A new facility was opened in the fall of 2002 in a unique shared building with the catholic school Holy Cross Catholic Secondary School. The two schools share some facilities, including the five gyms, the library, the cafeteria, the auditorium, computer labs, technology labs, and various other classrooms, while also maintaining completely separate schools. The school's academic achievements are well above average for EQAO math testing.

The New SDCI
On September 3, 2002 over a thousand students, staff and alumni walked with the director, Bill Bryce from the old school site at 96 Kittridge Street East some 3.2 kilometres to the new building at 361 Second Street. They walked behind a huge student made banner declaring that "SDCI LIVES ON".

SDCI has named three classrooms in honour of famous graduates. Two history classrooms, Room 249 and 247, have been named after Sir Arthur Currie and James T. Shotwell. The music room has been named after Don Wright. In addition, one English classroom, Room 232, is named after Stephen Leacock.

During the 2004–2005 school year, three portable classrooms were brought to SDCI.  After two years of lobbying, Strathroy was granted an addition, completed in January 2008. Construction started on November 13, 2006 at two different sites. The north addition has 14 academic classrooms, and renovations were conducted in the existing building to accommodate SDCI's growing developmental program. The other addition includes a new gym, a greenhouse, and specialty rooms for hospitality and technology.

Alumni

Brian Campbell – Currently an NHL defenseman for the Chicago Blackhawks. Member of the 1999 Canadian World Junior Championships silver medal winning team and 2010 Stanley Cup Champion.
 Darryl Campbell – Retired professional hockey player.
 Max Campbell – 5th round NHL draft pick by the New York Rangers in 2007.
Sir Arthur Currie – Canadian General during World War I
 Chris Daw – Gold medalist at the 2006 Paralympic Games in Turin, Italy in curling ;2000 Paralympic Games in Sydney, Australia in wheelchair rugby; 1988 Paralympic Games in Seoul, South Korea in track;. Only one of a handful to represent Canada at both Summer and Winter Paralympic Games. Daw was once considered the fastest wheelchair athlete in the world.
 John Dymond: Bassist for Blackie and the Rodeo Kings, as well as other well-known Canadian artists such as Amanda Wilkinson, The Wilkinsons, k.d. lang, Bruce Cockburn and more
Stephen Leacock – Student teacher at the High Street campus of SDCI for three months in 1888 – see: "The Boy I Left Behind Me", S. Leacock (1936)
Andy McDonald – Retired professional hockey player. 2000 Hobey Baker Award Finalist, NHL All-Star and 2007 Stanley Cup Champion. 
 Cole Pearn – NASCAR Crew chief for Martin Truex, Jr.'s No. 78 Furniture Row Racing
 Kris Pearn – Story Artist and Conceptual Artist at Sony Pictures Imageworks. Formerly a Conceptual Artist and Character Designer at Fox Feature Animation Studios. Resume includes features such as Around the World in 80 Days, Titan A.E., Open Season, and Cloudy with a Chance of Meatballs. Kris also taught 'Character Design' at Sheridan College in Oakville, Ontario.
 Mark Shephard – 43rd round draft pick of the Los Angeles Dodgers in the 1994 draft.
James T. Shotwell – Author of the Labour provisions in the Treaty of Versailles
Janaya Stephens – film actress prominently featured in the Left Behind series of films as Chloe Steele.

See also
List of high schools in Ontario

References

High schools in Middlesex County, Ontario
Strathroy-Caradoc
Educational institutions established in 1914
1914 establishments in Ontario